Riccardo Galli (born 19 June 1993) is an Italian football player.

Club career
He made his Serie C debut for Cremonese on 6 October 2013 in a game against Reggiana.

After playing for Paganese on loan in the 2017–18 season, he moved to the club on permanent basis on 1 July 2018, signing a two-year contract. He left the club at the end of the 2018–19 season.

On 22 August 2019, he joined Padova on a 1-year contract.

References

External links
 

1993 births
Sportspeople from Cremona
Living people
Italian footballers
U.S. Cremonese players
A.C. Renate players
Paganese Calcio 1926 players
Calcio Padova players
Serie C players
Serie D players
Association football goalkeepers
Footballers from Lombardy
S.C. Caronnese S.S.D. players